Beaven is a surname. Notable people with the surname include:

Bob Beaven (born 1941), former Australian rules footballer
Derek Beaven (born 1947), British novelist
Don Beaven KNZM CBE (1924–2009), New Zealand medical researcher into diabetes
Ellie Beaven (born 1980), English actress
Frederic Beaven (1855–1941), bishop of Mashonaland/Southern Rhodesia from 1911 to 1925
James Beaven (1801–1875), Church of England clergyman and author, professor of divinity at King's College, Toronto
Luke Beaven (born 1989), English cricketer
Peter Beaven (1925–2012), New Zealand architect based in Christchurch
Robert Beaven (1836–1920), British Columbia politician and businessman
Thomas Daniel Beaven (1851–1920), the second Roman Catholic Bishop of Springfield in Massachusetts

See also

Beavan